Eutaenia is a genus of longhorn beetles of the subfamily Lamiinae, containing the following species:

 Eutaenia alboampliata Breuning, 1964
 Eutaenia albomaculata Breuning, 1935
 Eutaenia borneensis Aurivillius, 1911
 Eutaenia corbetti Gahan, 1893
 Eutaenia formosana Matsushita, 1941
 Eutaenia oberthueri Gahan, 1895
 Eutaenia trifasciella (White, 1850)

References

Lamiini